Francesco Maria Piccolomini (died 1599) was a Roman Catholic prelate who served as Bishop of Montalcino (1554–1599) and Bishop of Pienza (1563–1599).

Biography
On 20 April 1554, Francesco Maria Piccolomini was appointed during the papacy of Pope Julius III as Bishop of Montalcino.
On 25 November 1554, he was consecrated bishop by Scipione Bongalli, Bishop of Civita Castellana e Orte, with Cesare Cibo, Archbishop of Turin, and Alessandro Piccolomini, Bishop of Pienza, serving as co-consecrators. 
In December 1563, he was appointed during the papacy of Pope Pius IV as Bishop of Pienza.
He served as Bishop of Montalcino and Bishop of Pienza until his death in 1599.

Episcopal succession
While bishop, he was the principal co-consecrator of:
Giovanni Antonio Locatelli, Bishop of Venosa (1568);
Cipriano Pallavicino, Archbishop of Genoa 1568); and
Ascanio Piccolomini, Titular Archbishop of Colossae and Coadjutor Archbishop of Siena (1579).

References

External links and additional sources
 (for Chronology of Bishops) 
 (for Chronology of Bishops) 
 (for Chronology of Bishops) 
 (for Chronology of Bishops) 

16th-century Italian Roman Catholic bishops
Bishops appointed by Pope Julius III
Bishops appointed by Pope Pius IV
1599 deaths
Bishops of Pienza